Bonnie Camplin (born 1970) is a British artist and a fine art lecturer at Goldsmiths College, London. She was a 2015 Turner Prize nominee, nominated for the exhibition The Military Industrial Complex, which was shown at the South London Gallery.

Education 

Bonnie Camplin studied at Saint Martins School of Art, London for a BA in Fine Art Film and Video (1989–92), and a Postgraduate Diploma in Advanced Photography (1995–96).

Work 
Camplin has worked across film and video, photography, sculpture, painting, performance, music and drawing. She broadly describes her practice as 'the Invented Life'.

She has collaborated with artists including Lucy McKenzie and Paulina Olowska and was in the band DonAteller with Mark Leckey, Ed Laliq and Enrico David.

Exhibitions

Selected solo exhibitions 

 1993 What About My Innocence, Maximus Nightclub, London
2000 Now We Are Five, Plank Gallery, London
2011 Galerie Cinzia Friedlaender, Berlin
2012 STW, Michael Benevento in Los Angeles
2013 No More Car Sick, Cabinet, London
2014 Liverpool Biennial, Liverpool
2015 The Military Industrial Complex, South London Gallery, London
2017 Bonnie Camplin, Camden Arts Centre, London

Selected group exhibitions and screenings 

 1999 The Lux, London
 2001 Roll Yer Own, Institute of Contemporary Arts, London
 2001 Electric Blue, The Barbican, London
2002 The Difference Between Us, Five Years Gallery (Saatchi East), London
2009 When the Wind Blows Up You, Chisenhale Gallery, London
2011 Madame Realism, Marres Centre for Contemporary Art, Maastricht
2012 Sound works, Institute of Contemporary Arts, London
2013 Assembly, A survey of Recent Artists Film and Video in Britain 2008–2013, Tate Britain, London

References

Living people
Academics of Goldsmiths, University of London
English contemporary artists
English women artists
1970 births
20th-century English women
20th-century English people
21st-century English women
21st-century English people